Dichomeris heteracma is a moth in the family Gelechiidae. It was described by Edward Meyrick in 1923. It is found in Peru and Amazonas, Brazil.

The forewings are whitish ochreous with a few dark fuscous specks, more numerous along the costa. Sometimes, there is a cloudy fuscous dot in the disc at one-fourth. The stigmata are dark fuscous, the plical beneath the first discal. There is an elongate cloudy mark of dark fuscous irroration (sprinkling) on the costa at two-thirds, and more or less undefined dark fuscous irroration towards the termen, often with a cloudy dark apical spot. There is a marginal series of black dots around the posterior part of the costa and termen. The hindwings are grey.

References

Moths described in 1923
heteracma